Guam competed at the 2011 World Championships in Athletics from August 27 to September 4 in Daegu, South Korea. A team of 2 athletes was announced to represent the country in the event.

In the women's 100m, Pollara Cobb advanced from the preliminaries to the heats and set a Guamanian record in the latter race with her time of 12.55 seconds.

Her record was later broken by high schooler Regine Tugade, who said that Cobb's records provided inspiration for her: "I always wanted to be like her."

Results

Men

Women

References

External links
Official local organising committee website
Official IAAF competition website

Nations at the 2011 World Championships in Athletics
World Championships in Athletics
Guam at the World Championships in Athletics